Sankt Kathrein am Hauenstein is a municipality in the district of Weiz in the Austrian state of Styria.

Geography
The municipality lies in the valley of the Hirschbach, a tributary of the Feistritz, in the Fischbach Alps.

References

External links 
 www.st-kathrein-hauenstein.at - city website

Cities and towns in Weiz District
Fischbach Alps